The bridled white-eye (Zosterops conspicillatus) (Chamorro name: nosa) was a species of bird in the family Zosteropidae. It was endemic to the island of Guam in the Mariana Islands. The species' natural habitat was subtropical or tropical moist lowland forests. One traditionally recognized subspecies is endemic to the Northern Mariana Islands, on the islands of Tinian, Saipan and Aguijan.

The nominate subspecies formerly occurred on the island of Guam, but is now considered extinct due to the invasive and predatory brown tree snake. The last known sighting was in 1983.

The remaining subspecies, Z. (c.) saypani, is separated as a full species by some authorities. Until recently, this population was extremely abundant across its native range. 2007-2008 surveys estimated a population of 620,000-940,000, with approximately 534,000 birds on Saipan alone. In 2010, this species was the second most abundant breeding landbird encountered by surveyors on Saipan. The potential introduction of the brown tree snake on Saipan  and U.S. military activity on Tinian are expected to result in rapid population declines on these islands, which constitutes over 50% of this bird's range. A survey into the impacts these have had on the wild populations has not yet been conducted, but as a precautionary measure the species has been classified as endangered. The Saipan white-eye has a captive breeding program based at the Sedgwick County Zoo and National Aviary.

Formerly, the Rota white-eye was also considered as a subspecies of the bridled white-eye.

References

bridled white-eye
Birds of the Northern Mariana Islands
bridled white-eye
Taxa named by Heinrich von Kittlitz
Taxonomy articles created by Polbot